Dinner at My Place is a 2022 Nigerian romantic comedy drama written and directed by Kevin Apaa. The film stars Timini Egbuson, Bisola Aiyeola and Sophie Alakija in the lead roles. The film had its theatrical release on 28 January 2022 and opened to positive reviews from critics.

Synopsis 
The film is based on a Nigerian-American man Nonso (Timini Egbuson) who is planning to propose his girlfriend (Sophie Alakija) over dinner. He has already planned to gift the gold ring to his girlfriend which was worth $22000 and it originally belongs to his beloved mother as his deceased mother left that ring for him in memory. But to his surprise, things become worse as far as his intentions were concerned when his ex-girlfriend (Bisola Aiyeola) spoils the fun by entering the picture shows up uninvited.

Cast 
 Timini Egbuson as Nonso
 Bisola Aiyeola as Nonso's ex-girlfriend
 Sophie Alakija as Nonso's girlfriend
 Uche Montana
 Oluyemi Solade
 Chales Etubiebi
 Debby Felix
 Michael Sanni

Production 
Filmmaker Kevin Apaa revealed that he initially narrated the story suitable for a short film and made the short film with a duration of 11 minutes with the same title. It was released in 2019 and opened to positive reviews. The short film garnered critical acclaim winning eight awards and was also screened in film festivals in USA and UK. The positive reception to the short film encouraged Apaa to come up with a lengthy feature film by maintaining the same title. He and his crew members developed the script as a romantic drama film. The cast members who were roped in for the feature film had not previously appeared in the short film. The film was entirely shot in Lagos.

References

External links 

 
 
 
 

2022 films
2022 romantic comedy-drama films
English-language Nigerian films
Films shot in Lagos
Nigerian romantic comedy-drama films
2020s English-language films